The 1985–86 European Cup was the 31st season of UEFA's premier club football tournament, the European Cup. The European Champion Clubs' Cup was won by FCSB on penalties in the final against Barcelona. Steaua București became the first Eastern Bloc side to win the tournament. The final was decided mainly by goalkeeper Helmuth Duckadam, who (after keeping a clean sheet in the final) saved all four of Barcelona's penalties to secure the cup.

Juventus, the defending champions, were eliminated by Barcelona in the quarter-finals.

No clubs from England were entered into the competition during this year, owing to a ban from European competition in light of the Heysel Stadium disaster. Had the ban not been imposed, Everton would have represented England.

Bracket

First round

|}

The Belgian club Anderlecht received a bye from the first round.

First leg

Second leg

Bayern Munich won 6–2 on aggregate.

Austria Wien won 4–1 on aggregate.

Omonia won 10–0 on aggregate.

Budapest Honvéd won 5–1 on aggregate.

Steaua București won 5–2 on aggregate.

Zenit Leningrad won 4–0 on aggregate.

Kuusysi won 4–2 on aggregate.

Servette won 4–3 on aggregate.

Aberdeen won 7–2 on aggregate.

IFK Göteborg won 5–3 on aggregate.

Fenerbahçe won 3–2 on aggregate.

2–2 on aggregate; Barcelona won on away goals.

Porto won 2–0 on aggregate.

Hellas Verona won 5–2 on aggregate.

Juventus won 9–1 on aggregate.

Second round

|}

First leg

Second leg

Bayern Munich won 7–5 on aggregate.

Anderlecht won 4–1 on aggregate.

Steaua București won 4–2 on aggregate.

Kuusysi won 4–3 on aggregate.

Aberdeen won 1–0 on aggregate.

IFK Göteborg won 5–2 on aggregate.

3–3 on aggregate; Barcelona won on away goals.

Juventus won 2–0 on aggregate.

Quarter-finals

|}

First leg

Second leg

Anderlecht won 3–2 on aggregate.

Steaua București won 1–0 on aggregate.

2–2 on aggregate; IFK Göteborg won on away goals.

Barcelona won 2–1 on aggregate.

Semi-finals

|}

First leg

Second leg

Steaua București won 3–1 on aggregate.

3–3 on aggregate; Barcelona won on penalties.

Final

Top scorers
The top scorers from the 1985–86 European Cup are as follows:

References

External links
1985–86 All matches – season at UEFA website
European Cup results at Rec.Sport.Soccer Statistics Foundation
 All scorers 1985–86 European Cup according to protocols UEFA
1985/86 European Cup - results and line-ups (archive)

1985–86 in European football
European Champion Clubs' Cup seasons